Aveiras may refer to:

Aveiras de Baixo, civil parish in the municipality of Azambuja, situated in the district of Lisbon, Portugal
Aveiras de Cima, civil parish in the municipality of Azambuja, situated in the district of Lisbon, Portugal